The fourteenth and final season of the television series Dallas aired on CBS during the 1990–91 TV season.

Cast

Starring
In alphabetical order:
 Patrick Duffy as Bobby Ewing (23 episodes)
 Kimberly Foster as Michelle Stevens (16 episodes)
 Larry Hagman as J.R. Ewing (23 episodes)
 Howard Keel as Clayton Farlow (4 episodes)
 George Kennedy as Carter McKay (16 episodes)
 Ken Kercheval as Cliff Barnes (16 episodes)
 Sasha Mitchell as James Beaumont (17 episodes)
 Cathy Podewell as Cally Harper Ewing (10 episodes)
 Barbara Stock as Liz Adams (14 episodes)
 Sheree J. Wilson as April Stevens Ewing (7 episodes)

Additionally, the two-part series finale, "Conundrum", featured cast pics of following stars right after the opening sequence:
 Mary Crosby as Kristin Shepard
 Linda Gray as Sue Ellen Shepard
 Joel Grey as Adam
 Steve Kanaly as Ray Krebbs
 Jack Scalia as Nicholas Pearce
 Ted Shackelford as Gary Ewing
 Joan Van Ark as Valene Wallace

Special Guest Appearance by
 Barbara Eden as LeeAnn De La Vega (5 episodes)

Also Starring
 Gayle Hunnicutt as Vanessa Beaumont (7 episodes)
 Susan Lucci as Hillary Taylor / Sheila Foley (6 episodes)
 John Harkins as Control (4 episodes)
 Clifton James as Duke Carlisle (4 episodes)
 Jared Martin as Steven "Dusty" Farlow (1 episode)

Notable guest stars
Besides the returning supporting cast, Deirdre Imershein (Jory Taylor) joins the series in a major story-arc. A minor character in the Paris arc (played by Padraic Terence Duffy, Patrick's son) is called Mark Harris, the name of the character played by Patrick Duffy in Man from Atlantis.

DVD release
The fourteenth and final season of Dallas' was released by Warner Bros. Home Video, on a Region 1 DVD box set of five single-sided DVDs, on January 18, 2011. Like the other DVD sets of the show's last five seasons, it does not include any extras, besides the 23 episodes.

Episodes

References

General references

External links

1990 American television seasons
1991 American television seasons
Dallas (1978 TV series) seasons